Ernest Joseph Beam (March 17, 1867 – September 12, 1918) was a professional baseball player.  He was a right-handed pitcher for one season (1895) with the Philadelphia Phillies.  For his career, he compiled an 0–2 record in 9 appearances, with an 11.31 earned run average and 3 strikeouts.

See also
 List of Major League Baseball annual saves leaders

External links

1867 births
1918 deaths
Major League Baseball pitchers
Baseball players from Ohio
Philadelphia Phillies players
Sportspeople from Mansfield, Ohio
19th-century baseball players
Mansfield (minor league baseball) players
Green Bay (minor league baseball) players
Terre Haute Hottentots players
Peoria Distillers players
Brockton Shoemakers players
Philadelphia Athletics (minor league) players
Carlisle Colts players
Washington Browns players
Mansfield Haymakers players
Detroit Tigers (Western League) players
Sioux City Cornhuskers players